Edward Henry Kenelm Digby, 12th Baron Digby,  (24 July 1924 – 1 April 2018), also 6th Baron Digby in the Peerage of Great Britain, was a British peer and British Army (Coldstream Guards) officer.

Early life
He was the son of the Edward Digby, 11th Baron Digby. He studied at Eton and Trinity College, Oxford, and trained at the Royal Military Academy Sandhurst.

Career
During World War II, he served as an army officer with the British Army of the Rhine. As a cadet, he received an emergency commission as a second lieutenant on 15 February 1945, relinquished this commission on 22 May 1946 and received a regular commission in the Coldstream Guards from the same date.

Digby succeeded his father as Baron Digby in 1964. The House of Lords Act 1999 removed the right of hereditary peers to sit in the House of Lords. He served as Lord Lieutenant of Dorset from 1984–1999, and was appointed Knight Commander of the Royal Victorian Order in the 1999 New Year Honours.

Personal life
In 1952 he married Dione Sherbrooke (b. 1934), daughter of  Rear-Adm. Robert Sherbrooke and the former Rosemary Neville Buckley. They had two sons and a daughter:

 Henry Noel Kenelm Digby, 13th Baron Digby (b. 1954), who married Susan E. Watts, eldest daughter of Peter Watts, in 1980; they divorced in 2001.
 Hon. Rupert Simon Digby (b. 1956), who married Charlotte Fleury Hirst, second daughter of Robert Hirst, in 1986.
 Hon. Zara Jane Digby (b. 1958), who married, as his second wife, James Edward Caulfeild Percy, second son of Henry Edward Percy (a grandson of Henry Percy, 7th Duke of Northumberland), in 1993.

He died on 1 April 2018 at the age of 93.

Coat of arms

References

1924 births
2018 deaths
Alumni of Trinity College, Oxford
British Army personnel of World War II
Coldstream Guards officers
Deputy Lieutenants of Dorset
Edward
English justices of the peace
Knights Commander of the Royal Victorian Order
Lord-Lieutenants of Dorset
People educated at Eton College
Edward 12
Edward 12
Digby